Michael Salomon (born in Whitefish Bay, Wisconsin, United States) is an American music video/film director, who has directed many music videos, including many of Toby Keith's music videos. He directed the video for Metallica's "One", which was nominated for "Best Heavy Metal Video" at the MTV awards, and was declared one of the "Top 75 Videos Of All Time" in Rolling Stone's critics' poll.

He later won numerous awards, including the CMT (Country Music Television) "Director of the Year" awards in 1994, 1995 and 1996, Michael again performed his work, creating award-winning videos for  Toby Keith, Trisha Yearwood, Alan Jackson, Lonestar, Brooks & Dunn, over twenty videos for Sawyer Brown and others.  His association with Toby earned Salomon the CMT Flameworthy Awards in 2002, including one for "Director of the Year" and  awards in 2003 including "Video of the Year."

Most recently, Salomon teamed up again with Toby and directed the 2008 film Beer For My Horses, which starred Toby Keith, with guest stars Rodney Carrington, and Willie Nelson. Salomon had also directed the music video for "Beer for My Horses" in 2003.

Salomon also worked on projects for Garth Brooks, Madonna, Mick Jagger, Janet Jackson, Billy Joel, Whitney Houston, Bon Jovi, Ozzy Osbourne and many others as an editor.

In addition to the list of music videos, Michael has directed and or segment-directed a wide variety of longform home videos, commercials, network specials and syndicated series. He directed the NBC Special, "Garth Brooks: Live From Dublin." The special garnered an Emmy nomination for Salomon.

Filmography
"Beer for My Horses" (2008)

Videography

Videos directed
160 music videos are currently listed here.

References

American music video directors
Living people
People from Whitefish Bay, Wisconsin
Year of birth missing (living people)
American film directors